The AN/APG-77 is a multifunction low probability of intercept radar installed on the F-22 Raptor fighter aircraft. The radar was designed and initially built by Westinghouse and Texas Instruments, and production continued with their respective successors Northrop Grumman and Raytheon after acquisition.

It is a solid-state, active electronically scanned array (AESA) radar. Composed of 1956 transmit/receive modules, each about the size of a gum stick, it can perform a near-instantaneous beam steering (in the order of tens of nanoseconds).

The APG-77 provides 120° field of view in azimuth and elevation,. A range of 400 km or more, with the APG-77v1 with newer GaAs modules is believed to be possible while using more narrow beams.

More than 100 APG-77 AESA radars have been produced to date by Northrop Grumman, and much of the technology developed for the APG-77 is being used in the APG-81 radar for the F-35 Lightning II. The AN/APG-77 system itself exhibits a very low radar cross-section, supporting the F-22's stealthy design.

The APG-77v1 was installed on F-22 Raptors from Lot 5 and on. This provided full air-to-ground functionality (high-resolution synthetic aperture radar mapping, ground moving target indication and track (GMTI/GMTT), automatic cueing and recognition, combat identification, and many other advanced features).

See also
 Phased array
 Active electronically scanned array

References

External links
 AN/APG-77 radar technology explained
 f22fighter.com: AN/APG-77 
 

Aircraft radars
Military radars of the United States
Military electronics of the United States
Northrop Grumman radars
Radars of the United States Air Force
Synthetic aperture radar